Daviesia longifolia is a species of flowering plant in the family Fabaceae and is endemic to the south-west of Western Australia. It is an erect, many-stemmed shrub with scattered, erect, cylindrical phyllodes and yellow and red flowers.

Description

Taxonomy and naming
Daviesia longifolia was first formally described in 1839 by George Bentham in John Lindley's A Sketch of the Vegetation of the Swan River Colony. The specific epithet (longifolia) means "long-leaved".

Distribution and habitat
This daviesia usually grows in heath between Eneabba, the Blackwood River and Tarin Rock in the Avon Wheatbelt, Geraldton Sandplains, Jarrah Forest, Mallee and Swan Coastal Plain biogeographic regions of south-western Western Australia.

Conservation status
Daviesia longifolia is listed as "not threatened" by the Government of Western Australia Department of Biodiversity, Conservation and Attractions.

References

longifolia
Eudicots of Western Australia
Plants described in 1839
Taxa named by George Bentham